Heinrich Mederow (born 20 September 1945) is a German rower, who competed for the SC Dynamo Berlin / Sportvereinigung (SV) Dynamo. He won medals at international rowing competitions.

Mederow was born in 1945 in Königs Wusterhausen, Brandenburg, Germany. He stands 186 cm tall and weighs 84 kg.

References

East German male rowers
1945 births
Living people
Olympic medalists in rowing
Medalists at the 1972 Summer Olympics
Olympic bronze medalists for East Germany
Olympic rowers of East Germany
Rowers at the 1972 Summer Olympics
European Rowing Championships medalists
People from Königs Wusterhausen
Sportspeople from Brandenburg